This is a list of past and present members of the Senate of Canada representing the province of Alberta.

It had one senator starting in 1888. Three more were added in 1905, at time of granting of province-hood. Two more were added in 1915, first appointed in February 1918.

But long-standing vacancies can exist, so at various times since 1918, Alberta has not always had six senators.

Since 1965, senators have been able to serve only until they reach the age of 75.

Current senators

Historical

Western provinces regional senators
Senators listed were appointed to represent the Western Provinces under section 26 of the Constitution Act. This clause can be used to appoint two extra senators to represent four regional Senate divisions: Ontario, Quebec, the Maritimes and the Western Provinces. It has been used only once, in 1990.

As vacancies open up among the normal members of the Senate, they are automatically filled by the regional senators. Regional senators may also designate themselves to a senate division in any province of their choosing in their region.

See also
Alberta Senate nominee election
Lists of Canadian senators

Notes and references

External links
Current Senators List Parliament Website
A Legislative  and Historical Overview of the Canadian Senate

 
Alberta
Senators